Dulaney High School is a secondary school in Timonium, Baltimore County, Maryland, United States. The school serves a generally upper-middle class suburban community, with students from Timonium and surrounding areas in Baltimore County. Dulaney is a Blue Ribbon School and ranked No. 259 nationwide in Newsweek magazine's 2010 survey of top public high schools in the U.S. It is situated on  adjacent to Dulaney Valley Memorial Gardens. Their main rival is Towson High School.

History
Built in the early 1960s, the school graduated its first senior class in 1965.  As of 2015, Dulaney had reported a total enrollment of 1,851 students. The school is accredited by the state of Maryland and is a member of the National Association for College Admission Counseling. There were 186 faculty members in the 2015–2016 school year.

Various proposals to renovate or replace the school building were made in 2016 and 2017. County officials budgeted $40 million in 2017 to renovate and air condition the facility, but the plan was rejected when parents contended that an entirely new school should instead be considered. In response, the then-County Executive proposed that the fiscal year 2019 budget include planning for a new high school to ease overcrowding at Dulaney and other area high schools. Funding was not forthcoming, however, and the Baltimore County Board of Education renewed its capital budget request for Fiscal  Included in the overall $216 million sought would be replacement buildings for Dulaney and Towson High School.

Academics
Dulaney High school received a 65.8 out of a possible 100 points (65%) on the 2018–2019 Maryland State Department of Education Report Card and received a 4 out of 5 star rating, ranking in the 62nd percentile among all Maryland schools.

Advanced Placement
In Baltimore County, Dulaney offers the highest number of Advanced Placement courses. In Spring 2005, 438 Dulaney students took 975 Advanced placement exams. Of this number, 85% scored  the exams (on a scale of 1 to 5). In the 2004–2005 school year, 67% of seniors and 42% of juniors were enrolled in at least one AP course. Also in 2004–2005, 172 students received AP Scholar designation: 61 AP Scholars; 27 AP Scholars with Honors; 68 AP Scholars with Distinction; and 16 National AP Scholars.

Students
The 2019–2020 enrollment at Dulaney High School was 1914 students.

Activities
Dulaney hosts more than 70 different clubs and organizations for its students. Among the clubs are: Peer Tutors, Science News Club, Girl Up, K-Pop Dance Club, Dance Team, Dulanians, Key Club, Sports Teams, and the National Honor Society. The Peer Tutors help students who have trouble in a wide array of subjects, usually for service hours or National Honor Society points. The Dulanians help adjust incoming 9th graders to the school, and show them the way at orientations, and other events. The Key Club is a service-oriented club that meets weekly, and hosts many service opportunities during the year. Dulaney also offers a theatrical program, which performs yearly plays as well as musicals. Dulaney also has a VEX Robotics team; it used to have a FIRST Robotics Competition team, until the mentor stepped down in 2011. One of the largest and most prestigious organizations at Dulaney is the Lion's Roar Marching Band. The band marched in the 2011 and 2015 London New Year's Day Parades and has also marched several parades down Main Street, USA in the Magic Kingdom Park and Epcot at Walt Disney World in Orlando, Florida and performed in the 2013 Allstate Sugar Bowl Halftime Show.

Athletics
The Dulaney High School Lions have won the following Maryland State Championships:

State Championships
Girls Cross Country
Class AA 1981
4A 1992, 1994, 1995, 1996, 1997
3A 2001
Boys Cross Country
Class AA 1968, 1979, 1980, 1981, 1983
4A 2015, 2016
Field Hockey
Sportsmanship Award 2013
Golf
3A/4A 2000
Girls Soccer
4A-3A 1993
Boys Soccer
4A 1999 TIE
Volleyball:
4A 1999, 2000, 2013
Girls Basketball
Class AA 1988
Mildred Haney Murray Sportsmanship Award 1983, 1985, 1987
Girls Lacrosse
4A-3A 2005, 2006, 2016
Boys Lacrosse
4A-3A 1990, 1991, 2000, 2001, 2002, 2003, 2005, 2008
Girls Softball
Eugene Robertson Sportsmanship Award 2003 TIE
Boys Track and Field
Class AA 1969

Awards and rankings
Dulaney was awarded the Blue Ribbon School of Excellence in 1995. In 2010, Dulaney was named No. 259 on Newsweek magazine's "1,200 Top U.S. high schools" annual national survey.

Notable alumni
 
 Josh Abramson, entrepreneur and co-founder of the comedy website CollegeHumor, was one of the principal owners and founders of Connected Ventures, and the co-founder, owner, and CEO of the crowdsourced T-shirt design company TeePublic
 Charla Baklayan Faddoul, reality television personality who appeared on The Amazing Race 5 and ''The Amazing Race: All-Stars
 Brian Balmages, composer, conductor, and music educator.
 Nicholas Waggoner Browning, convicted murderer 
 Mark Bowden, author
 Kathryn Craft, author of literary fiction and contemporary women's fiction
 Monica Dogra, actress
 Kendel Sibiski Ehrlich, radio talk show host
 Alex Gaskarth, Lead Singer of All Time Low
 J.B. Jennings, Maryland State Senator
 Jill Johnson, Class of 1986
 Phil Karn, Internet engineer
 Rjyan Claybrook Kidwell, founder of the music project Cex.
 Kevin Kilner, actor
 Dawn Kotoski, International opera soprano 
 Chris Norman, Flautist
 Sean Rush, Professional soccer player
 Ricky Van Veen, co-founder of CollegeHumor.com
 Crystal C. Watkins Johansson, neuroscientist and psychiatrist
 Bob Wheeler, Olympian, 1972 Munich Olympics (1500 meters)
 Cheryl Wheeler, Folk musician/songwriter, Class of 1969
 Gregory R. Wiseman, NASA astronaut

References

External links

Public high schools in Maryland
Baltimore County Public Schools
Middle States Commission on Secondary Schools
Baltimore County, Maryland landmarks
Educational institutions established in 1962
Timonium, Maryland
1962 establishments in Maryland